Silent Lake Provincial Park is a provincial park located on Silent Lake in eastern Ontario, Canada, near Bancroft.

Silent Lake is located in the Canadian Shield. Recreational activities include swimming, hiking, cycling, kayaking, and canoeing; in winter, there is cross-country skiing. Canoe and kayak rentals and yurt camping are also available within the park. No motor boats or electric motors are permitted on Silent Lake.

References

External links

Official site

Provincial parks of Ontario
Protected areas of Hastings County
Year of establishment missing
Campsites in Canada